Le Carrousel de Lancelot  is a traditional family carousel attraction in Disneyland Park (Paris)'s Fantasyland area. The ride features organ music from various Disney films.

Summary
The ride features organ music renditions of songs from films including: Beauty and the Beast, Snow White and the Seven Dwarfs, Aladdin, and other Disney movies. The ride's seating includes traditional carrousel horse-shaped seats and two-person bench carriage seats. It includes the 16 horses on an outer ring of the carrousel, with them sculpted wearing intricately detailed armor, and 70 horses in the inner rings of the ride, positioned in order of the colors of the rainbow. This ride is the second largest carrousel within the Disney Parks. Similarly to the other Fantasyland carrousel attractions at Disney theme parks, the Excalibur sword statue can be found nearby in the Castle Courtyard.

See also
King Arthur Carrousel
Prince Charming Regal Carrousel

References

Walt Disney Parks and Resorts attractions
Disneyland Park (Paris)
Philadelphia Toboggan Coasters carousels
1992 establishments in France